Shayan Munshi is an Indian actor and model. He made his debut in the 2003 Bollywood film Jhankaar Beats and has performed in award-winning films such as The Bong Connection and Carnival. Shayan has hosted Television series like Cook Na Kaho, High Tension, and worked with brands like L'Oreal, Levi's, Samsung and Bacardi.

He was a key witness in the murder trial of Jessica Lal. He is facing perjury charges as a result.

Filmography

Film

References

External links
 
https://www.instagram.com/shayanmun2022/

Indian male film actors
Living people
Indian male models
21st-century Indian male actors
Year of birth missing (living people)